Inyan Shel Zman or A Matter of Time is an Israeli teen drama broadcast from 1992 until 1996 on Israeli Educational Television.

The series focused on stories of high school students in Tel Aviv and talked about issues of adolescents such as school, adolescence, love, drafting to the army, social gaps, rape, violence and more. The series would focus in each episode on various secondary characters and show their world and their problems, in addition to the central plot which evolved around the main characters.

The series was directed Yael Graph and Shirley Stern, was written by Ronit Weiss Berkowitz and Eyal Graph.

The theme song to the series was written by Ehud Manor, composed by Rami Kleinstein and was performed by Gidi Gov.

In the years 1998-1999 a spin-off to the series was produced called "Esrim plus". The show ran for 2 seasons.

In 2010 Reshet announced a continuation of the series would be produced.. The revived show, which premiered in 2012 under the same name, revisits many of the characters from the original series, 20 years later. This show ran for one season consisting of 13 episodes.

Cast and characters
 Ido Markovich (Moshe Ben-Basat) - The protagonist and Yehezkel Vaitzman's best friend
 Yehezkel Vaitzman (Shai Kapon) - Ido's best friend. His mother lives overseas and left him alone to live in Israel.
 Dana (Dana Berger) - In seasons 1 and 2, she was a close friend of Sharon's, then in seasons 3 and 4, she became closer with Gali. At one point, she dates a student who is revealed to be a drug dealer (Dean). Dana used to be Ido Markovich's girlfriend. Aviv is shown to be in love with her.
 Sharon Cohen (Sharon Haziz) - Ido Markovich's good friend
 Noga Caspi (Ayelet Zurer) - A snobbish teenager. She is pious but very smart, and is in love with Alon
 Gali (Esti Yerushalmi) - A teenager without confidence and a good friend of Noga
 Tomer Ben-David (Uri Banai) - Comes from a poor family
 Matti Harel (Amit Lior) - The physical education teacher. He is very strict, but cares a lot about his students outside of class.
 Menashe Gabay (Amikam Levi) - A grumpy and boring history teacher
 Fogel - The school principal, an unseen character
 Aviv (Aviv Geffen) - A Rebel
 Alon (Uri Gottlieb) - A Nerd. He is in love with Noga
 Saar (Saar Badishi) - A Sensitive musician
 Sarit Ochayun (Galit Giat) - Wants to be friends with Saar
 Dean Bernstein (Eran Advir) - Dana's boyfriend. He often breaks the law and is involved in drugs
 Dafna (Michal Kapata) - The school beauty queen, she is rich and spoiled
 Michal (Hagit Shamli) - Yehezkel Vaitzman's good friend
 Omer Pikovski (Neta Sobol) - A quiet shy girl
 Itay Katz (Yaron Motola) - Many of his classmates thought he was a homosexual.
 Lior (Lior Halfon) - Dafna's friend
 Yaron Segal (Tomer Sharon)
 Nir Benbenisti (Nir Friedman)
 Doron (Mark Ivanir) - Drama teacher
 Keren Amiel (Merav Shoa)

External links 
Inyan Shel Zman - All Seasons, on Kan Educational.

Israeli drama television series
Israeli Educational Television
Israeli teen drama television series
1990s Israeli television series
1992 Israeli television series debuts
1996 Israeli television series endings
Youth in Israel
Culture in Tel Aviv